Samuel Gyasi Obeng (born May 1959, Asuom, Ghana) is a Distinguished Professor of Linguistics at Indiana University Bloomington since 2006 and Editor-in-Chief of Africa Today.
He is the founding editor of Issues in Political Discourse Analysis and Issues in Intercultural Communication and a Distinguished Honorary Member of the African Language Research Project at the University of Maryland Eastern Shore. Obeng obtained his Master of Arts degree in Linguistics from the University of Ghana in 1981, and his Doctor of Philosophy degree of Language and Linguistic Science from the University of York, England, in 1988. He was a Senior lecturer at Ghana University, Legon, Accra (1987-1994) and Assistant professor at Indiana University, Bloomington since 1994. Obeng's research interests include political, juridical and therapeutic discourse analysis, African onomasiology, pidgin and Creole languages, conversational phonetics, language description and language documentation.

Publications
Obeng published many articles, books and book chapters, including:
 Apologies in Akan discourse, Journal of pragmatics 31(1995), 709-734, North-Holland
 Language and politics: Indirectness in political discourse, Discourse & Society 8(1997), 49-83, Sage Publications
 with Beverly A. S. Hartford (Eds.), Intercultural communications, Nova Science Publishers, New York, 2008 
 with Beverly A. S. Hartford (Eds.), Topics in political discourse analysis, Nova Science Publishers, New York, 2008. UK edition, 2009
 Grammatical pragmatics: Language, power and liberty in Ghanaian political discourse, Discourse and Society 31(1):85-105 (2020)

References

Alumni of the University of York
Indiana University faculty
Linguists from Ghana
Living people
University of Ghana alumni
Academic staff of the University of Ghana
Africanists
1959 births